Boats du Rhône is a series of two sketches (a small one in a letter, the other very large and detailed with a reed pen) and three oil paintings, listed below, created by the Dutch artist Vincent van Gogh while living in Arles, France, during August, 1888.

Genesis
Van Gogh described his intention in a letter written August 13, 1888:

Painted a few hundred metres behind his Yellow House, where the railway yard abuts the Rhône river, he had written his brother Theo two weeks earlier:

A series was created, as argued by the Van Gogh Museum's curators Leo Jansen, Hans Luijten and Nienke Bakker, because van Gogh "split the subject he describes here into two, perhaps because he realised that a high vantage point and a sunset are very hard to reconcile in a single composition." They conclude, "We do not know exactly when the latter two studies were made; there may be a connection with a letter 697, in which Van Gogh says he has painted a sunset."

A leading 20th century van Gogh scholar, Jan Hulsker explained:

This argument has been expanded to:

References

Bibliography
 de la Faille, Jacob-Baart. The Works of Vincent van Gogh: His Paintings and Drawings. Amsterdam: Meulenhoff, 1970. 
 Hulsker, Jan. The Complete Van Gogh. Oxford: Phaidon, 1980. 
 Jansen, Leo, Luijten, Hans, and Bakker, Nienke Vincent van Gogh – The Letters: The Complete Illustrated and Annotated Edition, (Vol. 1-6), Thames & Hudson, 2009, 
 Naifeh, Steven; Smith, Gregory White. Van Gogh: The Life. Profile Books, 2011. 
 Tralbaut, Marc Edo. Vincent van Gogh, Macmillan, London 1969, 

Paintings of Arles by Vincent van Gogh
1888 paintings
Collection of the Museum Folkwang